A Single Woman may refer to:
A Single Woman (album), an album by Nina Simone, and its title song
A Single Woman (play), a play by Jeanmarie Simpson
A Single Woman (film), a 2009 film made by Kamala Lopez

See also
 "Single Women", a song by Dolly Parton
 Single Ladies (disambiguation)
 Bachelorette (disambiguation)